The Consulate-General of the United Arab Emirates in Karachi is a diplomatic mission of the UAE in Pakistan.

Location
The consulate is at 17/A Khayaban-e-shamsheer in DHA Phase V, Karachi. https://sp.mofaic.gov.ae/EN/consulates/Karachi/Pages/ContactUs.aspx

Consular services
The Consul-General of the UAE in Karachi is H.E. Bakheet Ateeq Al-Rumaithi. The consulate works under the Ministry of Foreign Affairs, Government of the United Arab Emirates, Abu Dhabi.

See also

 List of diplomatic missions of the United Arab Emirates
 List of diplomatic missions in Karachi
 Pakistan–United Arab Emirates relations

Notes

References

External links
 

United Arab Emirates
Karachi
Pakistan–United Arab Emirates relations